Stolyar is a Russian and Ukrainian language occupational surname literally meaning "carpenter, cabinetmaker joiner. Notable people with this surname include

Roman Stolyar (born 1967), Russian composer, piano improviser and educator
Vasyl Stolyar, Ukrainian businessman

See also
 

Russian-language surnames
Ukrainian-language surnames
Occupational surnames